Jean-Baptiste Cyrus de Timbrune de Thiembronne, Comte de Valence (22 September 1757 – 4 February 1822) commanded French troops during the French Revolutionary Wars and the Napoleonic Wars. A nobleman, he joined the French Royal Army as a captain of cavalry in 1778. By the time of the French Revolution he commanded a cavalry regiment. Valence led troops at Valmy in 1792 and was soon appointed to command the Army of the Ardennes. He led the right wing at Neerwinden. Becoming involved in Charles Francois Dumouriez's failed plot to seize control of the army, he defected in April 1793.

Valence returned to France during an amnesty and was elected to the Sénat conservateur in 1805. Emperor Napoleon named him to lead an infantry division in the Peninsular War where he led Polish troops at Ciudad Real and Almonacid in 1809. He commanded a heavy cavalry division during the French invasion of Russia leading his horsemen at Borodino and Vyazma. He served with Paul Grenier and Horace Sébastiani in the Hundred Days. After the Bourbon Restoration he entered the Chamber of Peers in 1819 and died in 1822. VALENCE is one of the names inscribed under the Arc de Triomphe, on Column 4.

References

 

French generals
French Republican military leaders of the French Revolutionary Wars
French commanders of the Napoleonic Wars
Counts of the First French Empire
People from Agen
Members of the Sénat conservateur
Burials at Père Lachaise Cemetery
Names inscribed under the Arc de Triomphe
Peace commissioners of the French Provisional Government of 1815
1757 births
1822 deaths